Bhimavaram Junction railway station is a station located in Bhimavaram, West Godavari district, Andhra Pradesh.

History 
The then meter gauge line was upgraded to broad gauge in 1961. GDV-BVRM Broad gauge railway opened by Jagjivan Ram Railway Minister on 8 October 1961.

Classification 
In terms of earnings and outward passengers handled, Bhimavaram Junction is categorized as a Non-Suburban Grade-4 (NSG-4) railway station. Based on the re–categorization of Indian Railway stations for the period of 2017–18 and 2022–23, an NSG–4 category station earns between – crore and handles  passengers.

Station amenities 

It is one of the 38 stations in the division to be equipped with Automatic Ticket Vending Machines (ATVMs).

See also 
 Bhimavaram town railway station

References

External links 
 https://web.archive.org/web/20180614044943/https://indiarailinfo.com/departures/bhimavaram-junction-bvrm/2080

Railway stations in West Godavari district
 
Bhimavaram
Railway junction stations in Andhra Pradesh
Railway stations on Bhimavaram-Narasapur branch line